Catch the Rainbow may refer to:

 Catch the Rainbow: The Anthology, an album by Rainbow
 "Catch the Rainbow" (Rainbow song), 1975
 "Catch the Rainbow" (Misia song), 2008